Jaime Eyzaguirre  (21 December 1908 – 17 September 1968) was a Chilean lawyer, essayist and historian. He is variously recognized as a writer of Spanish traditionalist or conservative historiography in his country.

Early life and marriage
Eyzaguirre was born into a religious upper-class family in Santiago. As young man he studied law in the Pontifical Catholic University of Chile (PUC) and was member of the Catholic student organization Asociación Nacional de Estudiantes Católicos. During his studies he was influenced by the Jesuit Fernando Vives and the writings of Manuel Lacunza.

Eyzaguirre started to court Adriana Philippi in 1929 and married her in 1934.

Essayist, historian and teacher
The PUC founded its Pedagogy School (Escuela de Pedagogía) in 1943 and contracted Eyzaguirre to be in charge of the History of Chile (Historia de Chile) classes. Most of the students of the time were priests, nuns and brothers. He was assisted by Mario Góngora is some classes. Apart from this part-time work Eyzaguirre was also part-time teacher at Liceo Alemán.

At the Pedagogy School, Eyzaguirre met Ricardo Krebs, who was also history teacher but had rather few contacts, and introduced him to the Catholic intellectual elite of Santiago. His salary is reported to have been low at PUC, and when "raised., it mostly had to do with the currency inflation that was experienced in Chile. Nevertheless, he was allowed to rent a small local owned by the Archbishopric of Santiago at a relatively low price. Here, Eyzaguirre ran a small bookshop called El Arbol until the late 1950s when it was closed. Despite his economic hardships he twice refused to be assigned ambassador to Spain. Eyzaguirre thought any diplomatic work he did would need to compete with his work as historian and therefore he would not be able to accomplish a dedicated work in diplomacy. At the same time, the writings of Léon Bloy provided him with comfort about his economic hardship.

Evaluation of Spain in the Americas 
His cultural and ethnic evaluation of Spanish colonization of the Americas and mestizo result:

O'Higgins and Spain
A milestone in the work of Eyzaguirre was his essay O'Higgins, which won a prize in 1946 to commemorate the centenary of the death of Bernardo O'Higgins. It was the first written work that granted Eyzaguirre some income. The reward helped Eyzaguirre to finance a trip to Spain in 1947. The seven-month journey reinforced his leanings for Spanish heritage in his historiography. In Spain, Eyzaguirre held a course on Chilean political and constitutional history at Universidad Central de Madrid. His stay in Spain made him target of attacks in Chile from those critical of Francoist Spain, in particular from people associated with the National Falange party (not to be confused with the Spanish movement). Personally, Eyzaguirre admired the stoic stance of the isolated Francoist Spain against both Soviet and Western pressure but never propagandised for Francoist Spain in Chile.

Back in Chile
For a time he was teacher of Jaime Guzmán. When the journal Historia was established in 1961 Eyzaguirre served as its first director.

Generally Eyzaguirre dealt with similar topics as Lewis Hanke. He despised 19th century writers such as José Victorino Lastarria and Domingo Faustino Sarmiento because he considered they "ruptured" the historical links to Spain and characterized their views as "apostasy".

The work of Eyzaguirre was criticized by left-wing historians. Mario Céspedes said in reference to Eyzaguirre's writings on the conquest of Chile that the conquest was a search for Indian labourers and "not a chivalrous journey". On the essay O'Higgins, Céspedes wrote that it lacked "the social and economic causes of the facts". The Marxist Julio César Jobet made a harsher criticism by accusing Eyzaguirre of "exalting backward doctrines and institutions" and undermining the influence of "French rationalist and critical thought in the development and progress of Chile".

Major works
Ventura de Pedro de Valdivia (1942)
O'Higgins (1946)
Hispanoamérica del dolor (1947)
Fisonomía histórica de Chile (1948)
Ideario y ruta de la emancipación chilena y Chile durante el gobierno de Errázuriz Echaurren (1957)
Historia del Derecho (1959)
Chile y Bolivia, esquema de un proceso diplomático (1963)
Historia de Chile (1965)
Historia de las instituciones políticas y sociales de Chile (1966)
Breve historia de las fronteras de Chile (1967)

Notes

References

Bibliography

1908 births
1968 deaths
Chilean people of Basque descent
20th-century Chilean lawyers
Legal historians
Members of the Chilean Academy of Language
People from Santiago
Pontifical Catholic University of Chile alumni
Academic staff of the Pontifical Catholic University of Chile
Academic staff of the University of Chile
20th-century Chilean historians
20th-century Chilean male writers
Chilean essayists
Chilean biographers
20th-century essayists
Commanders Crosses of the Order of Merit of the Federal Republic of Germany
Chilean scholars of constitutional law